Local elections were held in Iba, Zambales on May 9, 2016, within the Philippine general election. The voters will elect candidates for the elective local posts in the city: the mayor, vice mayor, and eight councilors.

Background
The incumbent Mayor Rundstedt Jun Ebdane will be facing former Mayor Ad Hebert Deloso for the mayoralty position. Ebdane will be teaming up with Irene Maniquiz, cousin of Botolan incumbent Mayor Bing Maniquiz. On the other hand, Deloso will be teaming up with Virgilio Riberal.

Candidates

Mayor

Vice Mayor

Councilors

|-bgcolor=black
|colspan=21|

References

2016 Philippine local elections
Elections in Iba